The 2012 Torneio Internacional Cidade de São Paulo (also known as the 2012 International Tournament of São Paulo) was the fourth edition of the Torneio Internacional Cidade de São Paulo de Futebol Feminino, an invitational women's football tournament held annually in Brazil. It began on 9 December and ended on 19 December 2012.

Format
The four invited teams were in. In the first phase, the teams played each other within the group in a single round. The two teams with the most points earned in the respective group, were qualified for the next phase.

In the final stage, the first and second teams placed in Group. Played only one match, becoming the champion, the winner team. If the match ends in a tie, will be considered champion, the team with the best campaign in the first phase.

The third and fourth teams placed in the group. Played in one game, becoming the third-placed, the winner team. If the match ends in a tie, will be considered champion, the team with the best campaign in the first phase.

Teams
Listed are the confirmed teams.

Group stage
All times are local

Group A

Knockout stage

Third place match

Final

Final results

Goalscorers

2 goals
 Fabiana
 Line Røddik Hansen
 Johanna Rasmussen
 Sofia Huerta

1 goal

 Andressa
 Cristiane
 Débora
 Érika
 Rosana
 Marta
 Giovania
 Katrine Pedersen
 Pernille Harder
 Sanne Troelsgaard Nielsen
 Sofie Junge Pedersen
 Anisa Guajardo
 Maribel Dominguez
 Edite Fernandes

References
Notes

External links
Official Site (in Portuguese)

2012
2012 in women's association football
2012 in Brazilian women's football
2012–13 in Portuguese women's football
2012–13 in Mexican football
2012–13 in Danish women's football